Proetus is a genus of proetid trilobite found in Silurian-aged marine strata of Europe.

Etymology 

The generic name commemorates Proetus, a mythical king of Argos and Tiryns, son of King Abas of Argo.

Taxonomy 

Proetus is the type genus of the order Proetida, and of the family Proetidae. The genus became a wastebasket taxon that held numerous species of similar looking trilobites from the Ordovician to Carboniferous periods. Most of these species have been split off into other genera, leaving only P. concinnus and P. latifrons as the only confirmed members.

Distribution 
Fossils of the type species, P. concinnus, are found in Wenlock-aged marine strata of Sweden, Great Britain, Estonia, and Germany. Fossils of the other recognized species, P. latifrons, are found in Llandovery-aged marine strata of Ireland and Great Britain.

References 

Proetidae
Proetida genera
Silurian trilobites of Europe
Silurian first appearances
Silurian extinctions
Fossil taxa described in 1831